Patricia English (October 1931 – 13 August 2016) was an American born, British television actress.

Early years
English was born Patricia Anne Shippam in Detroit, Michigan. Patricia Anne Fox was her maiden name and Patricia is of English parents who happened to be in America at that time.

Career
She appeared in various episodes of television series such as Mogul, Department S, The Champions, The Avengers, and The Rat Catchers.

Personal life
English wed Desmond Alfred Cohen in 1960, and they remained married until his death in 2000. She gave up acting to concentrate on her marriage, which was childless. English was a natural redhead who spent part of her retirement running a guest house in Truro, Cornwall.

Filmography
Confess, Killer (1957) - Mrs. Digby
Two and Two Make Six (1962) - Club Stewardess
Sammy Going South (1963) - Mrs. Hartland (uncredited)
The Avengers (1962-1967, TV Series) - Dr. James (Never, Never Say Die) / Marion Howard / Carla Berotti

References

External links

1931 births
2016 deaths
British television actresses
British film actresses
Actresses from Detroit
21st-century American women